Marco Bürki (born 10 July 1993) is a Swiss professional footballer who plays for Thun.  He is a left-footed centre-back.

Club career
Bürki is a product of the Young Boys youth team and made his senior debut during the 2011–12 season. He became a regular in the senior side during the 2012–13 season, making 16 league appearances. In an effort to get more game time, Bürki joined fellow first division side FC Thun in 2015 on a two-year loan deal. He returned to Young Boys ahead of the 2017–18 season and was part of the squad that won the Swiss Super League, their first league title for 32 years.

In the summer of 2018, Bürki joined Belgian First Division A side Zulte Waregem on a three year deal with an option for an extra year. Despite the club finishing in eleventh place in his debut season, Bürki was praised for his assured performances in defense and was linked to numerous clubs in Europe's top five leagues including Deportivo Alavés, Norwich City, and Torino.

In February 2020, Bürki returned to his native Switzerland and joined FC Luzern after a 1.5 seasons with Zulte Waregem.

Personal life
He is the younger brother of St. Louis City SC and Swiss national team goalkeeper Roman Bürki.

Honours
Young Boys
Swiss Super League: 2017–18

References 

1993 births
Footballers from Bern
Living people
Swiss men's footballers
Association football defenders
Switzerland youth international footballers
Switzerland under-21 international footballers
BSC Young Boys players
FC Thun players
S.V. Zulte Waregem players
FC Luzern players
Swiss Super League players
Belgian Pro League players
Swiss Challenge League players
Swiss expatriate footballers
Expatriate footballers in Belgium
Swiss expatriate sportspeople in Belgium